Altengamme located in the Bergedorf borough of the Free and Hanseatic City of Hamburg in northern Germany, is a rural quarter on the right bank of the Elbe river. Altengamme is the most eastern part of Hamburg. In 2020 the population was 2,362.

Geography
The quarter has a total area of 15.6 km2. The quarter consists of the settlements Altengamme and Borghorst and the surrounding farm land. The western border is to the quarters Curslack and Neuengamme, with the river Dove Elbe as its border. In the East and North is the state Schleswig-Holstein with the district of Lauenburg. In the South the river Elbe is the border to Lower Saxony with the district Harburg. It is a part of the Vierlande area.

Demographics

In 1999 there were 854 households, out of which 30% had children under the age of 18 living with them and 21.3% of all households were made up of individuals. The average household size was 2.5.

In 2006 there were 52 criminal offences (24 crimes per 1000 people).

Population by year
The population is counted by the residential registration office for 31 December each year.

Education
There was one elementary school and no secondary school in  Altengamme.

Politics
These are the results of Altengamme in the Hamburg state election:

Infrastructure

Health systems
In Altengamme are one day care center for children, three physicians in private practice and no pharmacy.

Transportation
Altengamme is not serviced by the rapid transit system of the city train or the underground railway. Public transport is provided by buses.

According to the Department of Motor Vehicles (Kraftfahrt-Bundesamt), in the quarter were 1,185 private cars registered (539 cars/1000 people). There were 5 traffic accidents total, all 5 traffic accidents with damage to persons.

Notes

References

 Statistical office Hamburg and Schleswig-Holstein Statistisches Amt für Hamburg und Schleswig-Holstein, official website

Further reading
 Hans-Karl Lange: Altengamme im Wechsel und Wandel von acht Jahrhunderten. In: Lichtwark. 51. Publisher: Lichtwark-Auschuß, Bergedorf, 1987. See now: Publisher: HB-Werbung, Hamburg-Bergedorf. 
 HARRI (Pseudonym for Harald Richert):  Die älteren Kirchenglocken des ehemaligen Amtes Bergedorf . In: Lichtwark-Heft Nr. 69. Publisher: HB-Werbung, Hamburg-Bergedorf.

External links

Quarters of Hamburg
Bergedorf